Brick cheese is a cheese from Wisconsin, U.S., made in brick-shaped form. The color ranges from pale yellow to white, and the cheese has a sweet and mild flavor when young, and matures into a strong, ripe cheese with age. It is a medium-soft cheese.

Origins 
Brick cheese was originally produced in Wisconsin beginning in 1877. The cheese-making process was derived from white American Cheddar that is cultured at a slightly higher temperature, which results in a marginally higher fat content and a slightly altered protein structure. The resultant "brick cheese" has a slightly softer texture.

Production process 
Brick cheese is made in the form of a large rectangular or brick shape, but may also be named "brick" because the cheese curds are pressed with clay-fired bricks.

Culturing 
Brevibacterium linens grows on the surface of brick cheese, making it surface-ripened. Brevibacterium linens is also the bacterium responsible for the aging of Limburger cheese and many French cheese varieties. Cheesemakers often refer to the growth of the bacteria as a smear. This is reflected in the Brevibacterium's species name linens which is Latin for 'besmearing'.

The cheese is placed on wooden shelves, then gets washed with a whey and water mixture and turned. After several days the cheese is then packaged.

Regulations 
The US Code of Federal Regulations defines what the fat and moisture content of brick cheese must be. This Standard of Identity does not take into account that brick cheese should be surface-ripened with B. linens.

Corynebacterium and Arthrobacter are the necessary bacterial genera for smear cheese ripening. Brevibacterium linens, while present in many smear cultures, is not typical.

Applications
Brick cheese is the traditional cheese for Detroit-style pizza.

See also

 List of cheeses

References

External links
 The Story of Wisconsin Brick Cheese

American cheeses